Count Carl Gustaf Bonde af Björnö (28 April 1872 – 13 June 1957) was a Swedish Army officer, equerry and horse rider who competed at the 1912 and 1928 Olympics.

Military career
Bonde was born in Stockholm, Sweden and was the son of landowner, count Gustaf Fredrik Bonde af Björnö and his English wife Ida Horatia Charlotta Marryat. After passing his studentexamen in 1892, Bonde became a sergeant in the Life Regiment Hussars (K 3) in 1893 and second lieutenant in 1894 and lieutenant there in 1900. He retired in 1908 and became cavalry captain in the reserve in 1910. The year before, in 1909, Bonde was appointed Equerry of the court, and advanced in 1916 to Crown Equerry, a position he held for decades.

Sports career
Bonde was a prominent horse rider. In 1912 he won the gold medal in the individual dressage competition with his horse Emperor. Sixteen years later he won the silver medal as a member of the Swedish team. He also competed in the 1928 Olympic individual dressage competition with his horse Ingo and finished 19th.

Other work
Bonde possessed a wide range of entailed estates, including Vibyholm Castle and Hörningsholm Castle in Södermanland, Katrineholm, Bordsjö, Askeryd and Herrestad in Småland and Sävstaholm and Toftaholm.

He was a member of Halland County Rural Economy and Agricultural Societie's acquisition committee (Hallands läns hushållningssällskaps förvärvsutskott) and member of the Halland County landstorm. Bonde was an inspector of POW camps in Siberia from 1917 to 1918. He was chairman of the Stockholm Harness Horseman's Association from 1900 and chairman and vice chairman of the Swedish Equestrian Central Association in 1933–38. He served as a judge of equestrian competitions at the 1932 Olympics in Los Angeles.

Personal life
Bonde was married and divorced twice. He was married 1896–1919 to Blanche Charlotte Eleonore Dickson (1875–1960), daughter of James Fredrik Dickson and Blanche Dickson. Bonde was married a second time 1920–1941 to Ebba Wallenberg (born 1896), daughter of the banker Marcus Wallenberg, Sr. and Amalia Hagdahl. In the first marriage he was the father of Chief of Army Thord Bonde and colonel Carl C:son Bonde, and in the latter Peder Bonde, chamberlain and active in the so-called Wallenberg sphere.

Bonde's first wife Blanche Dickson inherited Tjolöholm Castle and they lived there until their divorce in 1919.

Awards and decorations
Bonde's awards:

Swedish
   King Gustaf V's Jubilee Commemorative Medal (1928)
   Commander 2nd Class of the Order of Vasa
   Knight of the Order of the Sword
  King Gustaf V's Olympic commemorative medal (Konung Gustaf V:s olympiska minnesmedalj)
  Medical Gold Medal (Sjukvårdsguldmedalj) (Swedish Red Cross)

Foreign
   Grand Officer of the Order of the Three Stars
   Knight 2nd Class of the Order of Saint Anna
   Knight of the Order of Leopold
   Military Cross Second Class
   Officer of the Ordre des Palmes académiques
   Red Cross Medal First, Second and Third Class
   Order of the Crescent
  Austrian Honour Decoration of the Red Cross, Second Class with decoration
  Bulgarian War Commemorative Medal

Bibliography

References

External links

profile

1872 births
1957 deaths
Swedish dressage riders
Olympic equestrians of Sweden
Swedish male equestrians
Equestrians at the 1912 Summer Olympics
Equestrians at the 1928 Summer Olympics
Olympic gold medalists for Sweden
Olympic silver medalists for Sweden
Olympic medalists in equestrian
Military personnel from Stockholm
Medalists at the 1928 Summer Olympics
Medalists at the 1912 Summer Olympics
Commanders Second Class of the Order of Vasa
Sportspeople from Stockholm